Richard "Ric" Lee (born 20 October 1945) is an English drummer of the blues rock band Ten Years After.

Biography
Lee was born in Mansfield, Nottinghamshire, England. Was a founding member of his first band, The Falcons. He was also a drummer for Ricky Storm and The Mansfields, which he was persuaded to leave in August 1965. Soon he took over drumming duties for The Jaybirds, with guitarist Alvin Lee, and bassist Leo Lyons. In 1966 they arrived in London, where a keyboardist, Chick Churchill also joined the band.

In 1968, the band auditioned at the Marquee Club in London under the name The Blues Yard, but quickly became the successful outfit, Ten Years After. With this group, Lee played at rock festivals including Woodstock in 1969 and the Isle of Wight Festival on 29 August 1970 as well as appearances at The Newport Jazz Festival, The Miami, Atlanta and Texas Pop Festivals. 

When Ten Years After disbanded in 1976, Lee formed March Music/Fast Western Productions undertaking music publishing, management and record production and signed acts such as the Incredible Kidda Band. He was rumored to be potential replacement in 1980 for deceased John Bonham in Led Zeppelin, but the band decided to disband in honor of their band-mate.

In 1994, Lee formed The Breakers with an old friend, Ian Ellis (ex-Clouds) and together they wrote and produced their first studio album "MILAN", which was released in July 1995. Along with tours of the UK and Europe, The Breakers were guests with Bryan Adams and Bonnie Raitt, on NBC Super Channel's "Talking Blues" programme that aired in Europe in March 1996.

In 2000, Ric Lee joined Kim Simmonds and Nathaniel Perterson in Savoy Brown for a European tour. 

In 2011, Lee formed the 'Ric Lee Blues Project' which was later renamed 'Ric Lee's Natural Born Swingers' for their 2012 album release Put a Record On. The band featured Bob Hall of Savoy Brown, Danny Handley from The Animals and British session bassist Scott Whitley who has worked with many major acts from around the world. The album received substantial airplay on European and internet radio. Handley and Whitely have left the band. John Idan, known for his work with the reformed Yardbirds, joined the band on guitar and vocals.

Ten Years After continued touring after Alvin Lee's death (on 6 March 2013) with a lineup featuring originals Chick Churchill and Ric Lee plus two new members: guitarist/vocalist Marcus Bonfanti (British Blues Awards winner) and bassist Colin Hodgkinson. This incarnation released its first studio album, A Sting in the Tale, in 2017.

Lee's autobiography From Headstocks To Woodstock was published by Grafika in May 2019. 

He has two children and lives in the Derbyshire Dales.

References

External links

 Biography

1945 births
Living people
20th-century English musicians
21st-century English musicians
English rock drummers
English record producers
English music publishers (people)
English songwriters
English rock musicians
English blues musicians
Blues rock musicians
British blues (genre) musicians
British rhythm and blues boom musicians
People from Derbyshire Dales (district)
People from Mansfield
Musicians from Nottinghamshire
Ten Years After members
Decca Records artists
Deram Records artists
Columbia Records artists
Chrysalis Records artists
Capitol Records artists
20th-century drummers
21st-century drummers
Chicken Shack members